Iqraar By Chance is a 2006 Bollywood film directed by K. Ravi Shankar, starring Shilpa Anand and Amarjeet Shukla in lead roles.

Plot
Born to East Indian parents, Rashmi Mehra (Shilpa Anand) lives a wealthy and care-free life in England, often overspends money, leading her dad to question her closely. On one such occasion, she manages to convince him that she can earn as much as  £5000 in one month. He accepts her challenge and she sets out to find work.

She soon finds out that it is not easy to get any job, especially without using her dad's name, or having any job skills. She does manage to convince the owner of "Suno" FM radio to let her con a young man in falling in love with her, while she ditches him on a reality show.

The young man, Rashmi has in mind is Raj (Amarjeet Shukla), who also uses the alias of CBI Officer R. B. Mathur, who has come all the way from India to nab a gang of drug-dealers. She will soon find out that Raj, too, has an agenda in falling for her, as he wants to convince his to-be father-in-law, Talwar, that he is married, and Rashmi is his fresh-from-India bride. Things get complicated when the underworld get word of original R.B. Mathur (Arbaaz Khan) and kidnaps Rashmi mistaken as his bride.

Cast
 Shilpa Anand as Rashmi Mehra
 Amarjeet Shukla  as Raj
 Arbaaz Khan as CBI Officer R.B. Mathur
 Rachana Maurya as Dancer in song "Sari Sari Raat Jagawe" ( special appearance )
 Rahul Dev  as Sikka 
 Narendra Bedi as Constable Dildaar Singh
 Kurush Deboo as Detective D'costa
 Aslam Khan Sanju as Aslam Ahmed Khan
 Manoj Pahwa as  Talwar, club owner
 Upasna Singh as Kalawati "Kal" Talwar
 Tiku Talsania as Radio Channel Owner
 Richa Varma as Sonia
 Deepa Bakshi as Tina Talwar

Music
Doston - Kunal Ganjawala, Vijay Prakash
Ek Baari Aja - Shreya Ghoshal, Udit Narayan
Ghoonghat Na Khol - Sonu Kakkar, Shabaab Sabri
Iqraar By Chance - Sonu Nigam, Sunidhi Chauhan
Saari Saari Raat Jagave - Sunidhi Chauhan, Vijay Prakash
Saari Saari Raat Jagave  (Remix) - Sunidhi Chauhan, Vijay Prakash
Teri In Aadaon Ne - Shreya Ghoshal, Vijay Prakash

Release
The Film was released on 6 October 2006. DVD was released by EROS Entertainment on 27 March 2007.

References

External links
 
 
 Iqraar by Chance (film) at Bollywood Hungama

2006 films
2000s Hindi-language films
Films about films
Films scored by Sandesh Shandilya